There have been four ships of the Royal Navy name HMS Penzance, named for the port of Penzance in Cornwall.  The ships motto is Diligenter Pensa (Diligent thought).

 The first  was a frigate of 1665
 The second  was a frigate of 1747
 The fourth and current  is a  launched in 1997 and commissioned in 1998.

Royal Navy ship names